Acacia is a 2003 South Korean horror film, directed by Park Ki-hyung and starring Shim Hye-jin and Kim Jin-geun. A re-release in 2011 changed the title to 'Root of Evil'.

Plot 
Unable to have children of their own, married couple Mi-sook and Do-il adopt a young boy named Lee Jin-seong. His name soon gets changed to Kim Jin-seong when he moves with Mi-sook and Do-il. The boy is drawn to an acacia tree in his new home's backyard, believing it to be his mother, and it soon becomes the focal point for an increasing number of strange occurrences when Jin-seong appears to have run away.

Jin-seong befriends an older girl named Min-jee. She tells Jin-seong that she cannot go to school as she has lost a lot of blood. After she kisses Jin-seong, he becomes even more aggressive and violent. He turns even worse as Mi-sook becomes pregnant and has a new baby named Hae-sung. Jin-seong, experiencing many emotional difficulties, becomes more withdrawn and confused. He starts to develop anger towards his adopted family, so much so that he tries to smother the new baby. Mi-sook gets so frustrated with Jin-Seong's actions and obsession towards the acacia tree that she decides to chop the tree down, which results in Jin-Seong allegedly running away.

After Jin-Seong runs away, the previously dying tree starts to bloom with spectacular life. Min-jee starts changing as well, becoming more obsessed with the acacia tree. She starts claiming to hear Jin-Seong's voice coming from inside the tree, witnessing paranormal experiences occurring around the tree, flowers, and ants attacking the people in Jin-Seong's family.

It is revealed that his mother gravely injured Jin-Seong by accident while she was trying to chop down the tree. Her husband saw this and helped her bury their adopted son's body, thinking he was dead. But when Jin-Seong's arm moved, alerting the couple that he was alive, Do-il smashed his body with the shovel and finished burying him. Jin-Seong's mother, out of guilt and stress, eventually created an illusion for herself that her son had run away, all the time sinking further and further into her guilt, losing her grip on reality.

Cast 
 Shim Hye-jin as Choi Mi-sook
 Kim Jin-geun as Kim Do-il
 Moon Woo-bin as Kim Jin-seong
 Park Woong
 Jung Na-yoon as Min-ji
 Min Hye-ryeong

References

External links 
 
 
 
 Review at Koreanfilm.org

2003 horror films
South Korean horror thriller films
Films directed by Park Ki-hyung
2000s Korean-language films
2003 films
2000s horror thriller films
2000s South Korean films